Asterogyne spicata is a species of flowering plant in the family Arecaceae. It is found only in Venezuela. It is threatened by habitat loss.

References

spicata
Flora of Venezuela
Vulnerable plants
Taxonomy articles created by Polbot